Wöhrden is a municipality in the district of Dithmarschen, in Schleswig-Holstein, Germany. Heinrich Scheidemann, one of the greatest organ composers of the early Baroque, disciple of Jan Pieterszoon Sweelinck and forerunner to J. S. Bach, was born in Wöhrden, in 1595.

References

Municipalities in Schleswig-Holstein
Dithmarschen